Peter Hayes (born Melbourne, 28 September 1957)  is a Sydney based, British trained, Australian television, film and theatre actor and director. He is perhaps best known for the role of Dr. Steven Ryan in the long running Australian soap opera, Prisoner.

Acting career
Hayes started acting while young with the Port Moresby Players in 1968 in a production of 1066. Wanting to become a professional actor he went on to train from 1982-1984 at the Webber Douglas Academy in London, United Kingdom. Hayes also holds a Bachelor Arts (Honours) from the University of Melbourne.

Television
Hayes appeared in Australian soap opera Prisoner as young Doctor and undercover handyman, Steve Ryan in 1985-1986. Hayes has also appeared in Rafferty's Rules as Peter Booth (1986). He has also appeared in Westbrook as Golledge,  Whitlam: The Power and the Passion (2013), Home and Away as Alan Willis,
Farscape and A Difficult Woman as Reporter (1998)

Film

Hayes has appeared in films including:

 2002 The Junction Boys - Adult Johnny, Fox Production Services 
 2000 Games Of the I - Jerry Clone, Dada Productions,  Director, Peter Buckmaster & Ralph Daymen
 1998 15 Amore - William, Mtxm Movies, Director, Maurice Murphy
 1997 The Venus Factory - Mr Hale, Tomahawk Pictures, Director, Glenn Fraser

Theatre

Hayes has had a long career in the theatre. He has appeared in:

 2013 Friday by Daniela Giorgi at The Old Fitzroy
 2012 Swings adapted from Schnitzler's La Ronde and directed by Peter Hayes
 2010 Through These Lines written & directed by Cheryl Ward at Headland Park
 2010 Macbeth directed by Chris Hurrell at Darlinghurst Theatre
 2004 Squirrels by David Mamet - Shane Morgan directed at the Cat & Fiddle
 2004 King Lear Riverside Parramatta & Bondi Pavilion
 2004 The Tempest Globe Shakespeare Australia 
 2002 The Merry Wives of Windsor directed by Jeremy Rice at Gunnamatta Park
 2001 Richard III for Always Working Artists
 1997 Flying Saucery by Mona Brand - Independent Theatre, North Sydney
 1991 Abingdon Square Belvoir Street Theatre, Sydney & Malthouse Theatre, Melbourne
 1990 Provincial Anecdotes directed by Joseph Uchitel at The Lookout Theatre
 1990 Struth by Mark Swivel - 7 characters, Marion Potts directed at Stables Theatre
 1989 The Barretts of Wimpole Street directed by John Krummel, Marian Street Theatre
 1989 Passion Play by Peter Nichols, directed by Noel Ferrier - Playhouse Theatre, Sydney Opera House
 1987 Romeo and Juliet directed by Mary Hickson in the Old Town Hall for the Darwin Theatre Group
 1987 The Little Prince for Theatre Nouveau
 1986 The Late Late Capitalism Show at The Footbridge Theatre, Sydney

Director

Hayes has also directed for the theatre:

 2010 The Man Who Fell Off His Bicycle by Glen Hergenhahn at TAP
 2006 Shakespeare’s Timon of Athens at Knox Grammar
 1997 Roo by Angus Strachan at Café Basilica & La Mama
 1994 Fireworks - The Fireraisers by Max Frisch & Fire Downunder by Pavel Kahout] at the Crossroads Theatre
 1993 assistant to Aubrey Mellor on The Beaux Stratagem for Queensland Theatre Company
 1993 John Osborne’s Luther at the Old Sandstone Church

External links

References

Australian male film actors
Australian male soap opera actors
Australian male stage actors
Male actors from Melbourne
20th-century Australian male actors
21st-century Australian male actors
Alumni of the Webber Douglas Academy of Dramatic Art
1957 births
Living people